Sarifer is a genus of beetles in the family Cerambycidae, containing the following species:

 Sarifer flavirameus Kirsch, 1870
 Sarifer seabrai Fragoso & Monné, 1982

References

Prioninae